Seven Days is an alternative weekly newspaper that is distributed every Wednesday in Vermont. The American Newspapers Representatives estimates Seven Days' circulation to be 35,000 papers. It is distributed free of charge throughout Burlington, Middlebury, Montpelier, Stowe, the Mad River Valley, Rutland, St. Albans, and Plattsburgh, New York.

Seven Days is published by Da Capo Publishing, Inc., and owned by Paula Routly and a group of longtime employees. 

Seven Days covers many aspects of life in Vermont.  Columns and stories in the newspaper often concern such topics as state and local politics, Vermont organizations and charities, and general human interest stories. It also features local music listings; an alternative style comics section; art, movie and theater reviews; event listings, local dining, classified advertisements, and personals.  Each year, Seven Days asks its readers to place votes for the "Seven Daysies" which is a compilation of favorite people and places to visit throughout the state.

In addition to publishing Seven Days, Da Capo hosts two annual events in Vermont: Vermont Restaurant Week and the Vermont Tech Jam.

History 
Seven Days was founded in 1995 by reporters Pamela Polston and Paula Routly. The original capital investment of $68,000 by angel investors was repaid within three years. Originally the paper's title was going to be the Vermont Voice, however a dispute over the name caused them to settle on Seven Days instead. Circulation of the newspaper in 1995 was around 12,000.

Angelo Lynn, owner and publisher of the Addison County Independent (a local newspaper based in Middlebury, VT) was a valued mentor to the pair of owners as they got their start.

From 1995 - 2002 Seven Days saw a 20% increase in revenue each year.

In 2013 Seven Days expanded its weekly circulation to 36,000 by including the Northeast Kingdom in its distribution radius.

Pamela Polston and Paula Routly, who co-founded the paper, were inducted into the New England Newspaper Hall of Fame in 2015. Consulting editor Candace Page was inducted into the New England Newspaper Hall of Fame in 2017.

In 2019, Seven Days hired reporter Kate O'Neill to launch a year-long project reporting on the opioid epidemic in Vermont.

In March 2020, with a decline in advertising revenue due to the coronavirus pandemic, Seven Days temporarily laid off seven employees.

Awards

Vermont Press Association

Lake Champlain Regional Chamber of Commerce 
2000 - Business of the Year

Burlington Business Association 
2008 - Business of the Year

Recognition 
2013 - Editor & Publisher - "10 Newspapers that Do It Right"

2013 - The Atlantic article "Strange Tales from the North Country: A Profitable (Print) Newspaper"

References

External links 

 

Companies based in Burlington, Vermont
Newspapers published in Vermont
Alternative weekly newspapers published in the United States
1995 establishments in Vermont
Publications established in 1995
Mass media in Burlington, Vermont